Jean-Olivier Brosseau (born 23 June 1967 in Bressuire, Deux-Sèvres, is a retired male race walker from France, who was affiliated with Sèvre Bocage AC during his career. He specialised in the 20 km distance and was selected for the World Championships in Athletics three times from 1993–1997. He competed at one Olympic Games – the 1996 Summer Olympics, where he was 35th in the men's 20 km walk.

Achievements

References

sports-reference
IAAF Fact & Figures

1967 births
Living people
People from Bressuire
French male racewalkers
Athletes (track and field) at the 1996 Summer Olympics
Olympic athletes of France
Sportspeople from Deux-Sèvres